The 1370s was a decade of the Julian Calendar which began on January 1, 1370, and ended on December 31, 1379.

Significant people

References